Košarkarski klub Plama Pur is a basketball club located in Ilirska Bistrica, Slovenia.

History

The club was founded in 1956 as a basketball section of TVD Partizan Ilirska Bistrica. It was renamed to KK Lesonit in 1962. KK Lesonit won the Slovenian Republic League in 1964 and qualify to Yugoslav First Federal Basketball League. In the 1965 season of the Yugoslav First Federal Basketball League, KK Lesonit won only once, against KK Rabotnički Skopje, finishing the season in last place with one win and 21 losses in 22 games. After being relegated from the Yugoslav First League, KK Lesonit played another three seasons in the Yugoslav Second League before being relegated back to the Slovenian Republic League in 1969. The club ceased to operate in the eighties, when basketball moved to indoor arenas and Ilirska Bistrica did not have adequate facilities. It was refounded in 1996 and is now named KK Plama Pur Ilirska Bistrica for sponsorship reasons. The club competed in the 3. SKL-West league until 2013, when it was promoted to the Slovenian Second Basketball League. In the 2013–14 Slovenian Second League season Plama Pur finished second, qualifying for playoffs to the Premier A Slovenian Basketball League. Plama Pur finished the playoffs in last place with a 0–4 score, with two losses against KK Šentjur and KK Elektra Šoštanj, respectively. In the 2014–15 season, Plama Pur finished seventh, barely escaping the relegation playoffs with a last round win over KK Celje, which sent Celje into the Slovenian Second League relegation playoffs. Before the start of the 2015–16 Slovenian Second League season, Martin Novak resigned after five years as head coach. He was replaced by Grega Nachbar, younger brother of basketball player Boštjan Nachbar.

Results in the Slovenian Second Basketball League

 2013–14 – 2nd place (20 wins/6 losses)
 2014–15 – 7th place (10 wins/12 losses)
 2015–16 – 6th place (12 wins/10 losses)
 2016–17 – 4th place (13 wins/9 losses)

Honours
Slovenian Republic League
 1964

External links
Official website 

Basketball teams established in 1956
Municipality of Ilirska Bistrica
Basketball teams in Slovenia
Basketball teams in Yugoslavia
1956 establishments in Slovenia